Papilio phestus is a species of swallowtail butterfly from the genus Papilio that is found on Solomon Islands, New Britain, New Ireland, New Hanover Island, and Admiralty Island.

The larvae feed on Citrus species.

Subspecies
Papilio phestus phestus (New Ireland, New Hanover)
Papilio phestus parkinsoni Honrath, 1886 (New Britain)
Papilio phestus reductus Rothschild, 1915 (Admiralty Islands)
Papilio phestus minusculus Ribbe, 1898 (Solomon Islands to New Georgia Group)

Biogeographic realm
This species is located in the Australasian realm.

Taxonomy
Papilio phestus is  a member of the polytes species-group. The clade members are

Papilio polytes Linnaeus, 1758
Papilio ambrax Boisduval, 1832
Papilio phestus Guérin-Méneville, 1830

See also
 East Melanesian Islands

References

Ebner, J.A. (1971). Some notes on the Papilionidae of Manus Island, New Guinea 1971 Journal of the Lepidopterists' Society 1971 Volume 25 :73-80  Figure. notes on  reductus Rothschild, 1915

External links
Butterfly corner Images from Naturhistorisches Museum Wien

phestus
Butterflies described in 1830